A raion (also spelt rayon) is a type of administrative unit of several post-Soviet states. The term is used for both a type of subnational entity and a division of a city. The word is from the French  (meaning 'honeycomb, department'), and is commonly translated as "district" in English.

A raion is a standardized administrative entity across most of the former Soviet Union and is usually a subdivision two steps below the national level, such as a subdivision of an oblast. However, in smaller USSR republics, it could be the primary level of administrative division. After the fall of the Soviet Union, some of the republics kept the raion (e.g. Azerbaijan, Belarus, Ukraine, Russia, Moldova, Kazakhstan, Kyrgyzstan) while others dropped it (e.g. Georgia, Uzbekistan,  Estonia, Lithuania, Latvia, Armenia, Tajikistan, Turkmenistan).

In Bulgaria, it refers to an internal administrative subdivision of a city not related to the administrative division of the country as a whole, or, in the case of Sofia municipality a subdivision of that municipality.

Etymology

List of countries with raion subdivisions
Fourteen countries have or had entities that were named "raion" or the local version of it.

History

Raions in the Soviet Union
In the Soviet Union, raions were administrative divisions created in the 1920s to reduce the number of territorial divisions inherited from the Russian Empire and to simplify their bureaucracies.  The process of conversion to the system of raions was called raionirovanie ("regionalization").  It was started in 1923 in the Urals, North Caucasus, and Siberia as a part of the Soviet administrative reform and continued through 1929, by which time the majority of the country's territory was divided into raions instead of the old volosts and uyezds.

The concept of raionirovanie was met with resistance in some republics, especially in Ukraine, where local leaders objected to the concept of raions as being too centralized in nature and ignoring the local customs.  This point of view was backed by the Soviet Russian People's Commissariat of Nationalities.  Nevertheless, eventually all of the territory of the Soviet Union was regionalized.

Soviet raions had self-governance in the form of an elected district council (raysovet) and were headed by the local head of administration, who was either elected or appointed.

Raions outside the Soviet Union

Following the model of the Soviet Union raions have been introduced in Bulgaria, Romania. In China the term is used in Uyghur in the Xinjiang Uyghur Autonomous Region.

In Romania they have been later replaced.

Raions after the dissolution of the Soviet Union
After the dissolution of the Soviet Union, raions as administrative units continue to be used in Azerbaijan, Belarus, Georgia, Latvia, Moldova, Russia, and Ukraine.

They are also used in breakaway regions: Abkhazia, South Ossetia, Transnistria.

In Georgia they exist as districts in Tbilisi.

Modern raions

Abkhazia

Abkhazia is divided into seven districts.

Azerbaijan

Belarus

In Belarus, raions are administrative units subordinated to oblasts. See also: :Category:Districts of Belarus.

Bulgaria
In Bulgaria, raions are subdivisions of three biggest cities: Sofia, Plovdiv and Varna. Sofia is subdivided to 24 raions (Sofia districts), Plovdiv - 6, Varna - 5 raions.

Moldova
Administrative divisions of Moldova

South Ossetia

Transnistria

Russia

Ukraine 

In Ukraine, there are a total of 136 raions which are the administrative divisions of oblasts (provinces) and the Autonomous Republic of Crimea. Major cities of regional significance as well as the two national cities with special status (Kyiv and Sevastopol) are also subdivided into raions (constituting a total of 118 nationwide).

Notes

References 

 

Administrative divisions of Russia
Municipal divisions of Russia
+Raion
Subdivisions of Belarus
Types of administrative division
Former subdivisions of the Socialist Republic of Romania
Russian-language designations of territorial entities
Subdivisions of Georgia (country)
Subdivisions of Ukraine